Louisiana's 29th State Senate district is one of 39 districts in the Louisiana State Senate. It has been represented by Democrat Jay Luneau since 2016, succeeding fellow Democrat Rick Gallot.

Geography
District 29 covers a narrow majority-black swath of Central Louisiana, incorporating parts of Bienville, Grant, Jackson, Lincoln, Natchitoches, Rapides, and Winn Parishes. The district snakes its way through much of Alexandria, Pineville, Natchitoches, Winnfield, Jonesboro, Arcadia, Grambling, and Ruston. 

The district overlaps with Louisiana's 4th and 5th congressional districts, and with the 11th, 13th, 22nd, 23rd, 25th, 26th, and 27th districts of the Louisiana House of Representatives.

Recent election results
Louisiana uses a jungle primary system. If no candidate receives 50% in the first round of voting, when all candidates appear on the same ballot regardless of party, the top-two finishers advance to a runoff election.

2019

2015

2011

Federal and statewide results in District 29

References

Louisiana State Senate districts
Bienville Parish, Louisiana
Grant Parish, Louisiana
Jackson Parish, Louisiana
Lincoln Parish, Louisiana
Natchitoches Parish, Louisiana
Rapides Parish, Louisiana
Winn Parish, Louisiana